The 2007 season was the 12th season of New York Red Bulls's franchise existence. They played their home games at Giants Stadium in East Rutherford, New Jersey.

Major League Soccer season

Eastern Conference

Overall 

 – Toronto FC cannot qualify for the CONCACAF Champions League through MLS.  Rather, they can qualify through the Canadian Championship.If they had qualified for the Champions League through MLS, then the highest placed team not already qualified would have qualified.
 – The winner of the 2007 MLS Supporters' Shield (D.C. United) and the winner of MLS Cup 2007 (Houston Dynamo) qualified for the 2008 CONCACAF Champions' Cup and the 2008–09 CONCACAF Champions League Group stage. The runner-up of MLS Cup 2007 and the winner of the 2007 U.S. Open Cup (New England Revolution) qualified for the 2008–09 CONCACAF Champions League Preliminary Round. Because New England qualified twice, the additional berth in the preliminary round was awarded to the 2007 MLS Supporters' Shield runner-up (Chivas USA).

Matches

MLS Cup Playoffs

Conference semifinals

U.S. Open Cup

Player statistics

Top scorers

As of 31 December 2007.

See also
2007 Major League Soccer season

References

New
New York Red Bulls seasons
Red bulls